"I Want You" is a song performed by French DJ and record producer Martin Solveig featuring Lee Fields. The song was released in the France as a digital download on 15 September 2008. It was released as the second single from his third studio album C'est la Vie (2008). The song was written and produced by Martin Solveig and peaked at number 59 on the French Singles Chart.

Track listing

Chart performance

Weekly charts

Release history

References

2008 singles
Martin Solveig songs
Songs written by Martin Solveig
2008 songs